Scott Curry (born 17 May 1988) is a New Zealand rugby union player. He plays for the New Zealand national rugby sevens team. He made his debut at the 2010 Dubai Sevens. He made his debut appearance at the Olympics representing New Zealand at the 2016 Summer Olympics.

Career 
Curry was ruled out of the All Blacks Sevens squad to the 2013 Rugby World Cup Sevens in Russia due to an injury he sustained during training. He was included in the squad for the 2014 Commonwealth Games in Glasgow. However, New Zealand lost to South Africa 12–17 in the final.

Curry captained the All Blacks Sevens side at the 2015 USA Sevens after DJ Forbes was injured in Wellington. He captained the rugby sevens side at the 2016 Summer Olympics. He won gold medal with the New Zealand team in the men's rugby sevens tournament during the 2018 Commonwealth Games. He captained the New Zealand side which triumphed at the 2018 Rugby World Cup Sevens tournament by defeating England 33–12 in the final.

He was named as the captain of the New Zealand squad to compete at the 2020 Summer Olympics in the men's rugby sevens tournament. He was also subsequently part of the New Zealand side which claimed silver medal after losing to Fiji 27–12 at the 2020 Summer Olympics. It was also New Zealand's first ever Olympic medal in the rugby sevens. Prior to the start of the delayed 2020 Olympics, he announced that he would consider on retiring from the sport after the Olympics.

He is also a trained science teacher.

Curry was part of the All Blacks Sevens squad that won a bronze medal at the 2022 Commonwealth Games in Birmingham. He was selected for the All Blacks Sevens squad for the 2022 Rugby World Cup Sevens in Cape Town. He won a silver medal after his side lost to Fiji in the gold medal final.

References

External links
 All Blacks Profile
 
 
 
 
 

1988 births
Living people
New Zealand international rugby sevens players
Rugby sevens players at the 2016 Summer Olympics
Olympic rugby sevens players of New Zealand
Commonwealth Games rugby sevens players of New Zealand
Rugby sevens players at the 2014 Commonwealth Games
New Zealand male rugby sevens players
Commonwealth Games medallists in rugby sevens
Commonwealth Games silver medallists for New Zealand
Rugby sevens players at the 2018 Commonwealth Games
Commonwealth Games gold medallists for New Zealand
Rugby sevens players at the 2020 Summer Olympics
Olympic medalists in rugby sevens
Olympic silver medalists for New Zealand
Medalists at the 2020 Summer Olympics
Rugby union players from Rotorua
New Zealand rugby union players
Rugby union flankers
Rugby union number eights
Rugby union centres
Manawatu rugby union players
Bay of Plenty rugby union players
Munakata Sanix Blues players
Medallists at the 2014 Commonwealth Games
Medallists at the 2018 Commonwealth Games
Medallists at the 2022 Commonwealth Games